Museum Pasifika (Nusa Dua Bali) is an art museum in Bali, Indonesia. It presents the Asian Pacific’s variety of cultural artefacts.
The museum was founded in 2006 by Moetaryanto P and Philippe Augier, and designed Popo Danes.

The museum's collection includes more than 600 artworks by 200 artists from 25 countries. The museum has a number of galleries:

Room I: Indonesian Artists
Room II: Italian Artists in Indonesia
Room III: Dutch Artists in Indonesia
Room IV: French Artists in Indonesia
Room V: Indo-European Artists in Indonesia
Room VI: Temporary Exhibition
Room VII: Artists on Indochina Peninsula: Laos, Vietnam, and Cambodia
Room VIII: Artists on Polynesia and Tahiti
Room IX: Premier Art of Vanuatu and the Pacific Islands Paintings of Aloi Pilioko and Nicolai Michoutouchkine
Room X: Tapa of Oceania and Pacific
Room XI: Asia: Several artworks on Japan, China, Thailand, Malaysia, and Myanmar and the Philippines

References

External links 
 Museum Pasifika website

Art museums established in 2006
Art museums and galleries in Indonesia
Museum Pasifika
Museum Pasifika
Museums in Bali
Museum Pasifika